The Bad Boy is the first solo album by former reggaeton artist Héctor el Father. The album features guest appearances from Mr. Notty, Ednita Nazario, Ken-Y, Polaco and Wisin & Yandel. The album was supported by the single "Sola" which was released alongside the album on November 21, 2006.

On the U.S. Billboard 200, it debuted at number 81, with about 20,000 copies sold in its first week. The album has sold more than 200,000 copies and has received various nominations in the Latin community, including one for a Lo Nuestro Award for Urban Album of the Year.

Track listing

The Bad Boy: The Most Wanted Edition 

On October 9, 2007, he released a special edition titled The Bad Boy: The Most Wanted Edition. It included a second disc with more songs and more featured artists. It also included a DVD.

Charts

Certifications

References 

2006 debut albums
Héctor el Father albums